A pigsty is an enclosure for raising pigs. Pigsty may also refer to:

 Pigsty (film), a 1969 Italian film
 The Pigsty, a folly in North Yorkshire, England